Joel Toivola (15 December 1915, Helsinki – 21 October 1999) was a Finnish diplomat and engineer.

Early life 
He earned a bachelor's degree in political science.

Career 
He was awarded the title of Special Envoy and Plenipotentiary Minister in 1970. He served as Ambassador to Beijing from 1961 to 1967. From 1969-1972 he served in the Ministry for Foreign Affairs administrative department and as Ambassador in Prague 1972-1976 and Bern 1976–1982.

Personal life 
He donated his art collection to Varkaus Art Museum lle. Toivolan säätiö jakaa apurahoja Kiina-tutkimukselle.

Joel Toivola's father Urho Toivola was also an Ambassador.

References 

1915 births
1999 deaths
Engineers from Helsinki
People from Uusimaa Province (Grand Duchy of Finland)
Ambassadors of Finland to China
Ambassadors of Finland to Czechoslovakia
Ambassadors of Finland to Switzerland
20th-century Finnish engineers